The Kapiskau River is a river in the far northeast of Kenora District in Northwestern Ontario, Canada. It is a tributary of James Bay.

Course
It continues southeast and then east before turning north to take in the right tributary Noluskatsi River. The river heads northeast, and takes in the right tributary Atikameg River and left tributary Beaver River. It continues northeast, takes in the right tributary Otadaonanis River just before the river mouth, then reaches its mouth at James Bay.

Watershed
The Kapiskau River and the Lawashi River are the two river systems (the former the southerly and the latter the northerly) that lie in between the larger Attawapiskat River to the north and the Albany River to the south.

Natural history
The mouth of the Kapiskau River is part of the "Albany River Estuary and Assoc. Coastline" (CA368) Important Bird Area.

Geology
Portions of the headwaters of the Kapiskau River and its tributaries lie within the southeastern edge of the Northern Ontario Ring of Fire.

Economy
The James Bay Winter Road that connects Moosonee and Attawapiskat crosses the Kapiskau River.

Tributaries
Otadaonanis River (right)
Beaver River (left)
Pekwako River (left)
Atikameg River (right)
Noluskatsi River (right)

References

Sources

Rivers of Kenora District
Tributaries of James Bay